I Killed The Devil Last Night is a mixtape by rapper Killah Priest, released on March 7, 2009, through Proverbs Records.
It features only a few guest appearances, such as 60 Second Assassin, who appeared in Killah Priest's album Behind the Stained Glass. Other notable appearances include Stat Quo, Hussein Fatal, DoItAll and Mr. probz. The mixtape was released as a free download exclusively on BallerStatus.com.

Track listing

References

2009 albums
Killah Priest albums